Dabney–Thompson House is a historic home located at Charlottesville, Virginia. It was built in 1894, and is a two-story Queen Anne style frame dwelling.  It is sheathed in weatherboard and features a steeply-pitched hipped roof with tall gables over all four projecting bays.  The house has projecting eaves and verges and decoratively-sawn exposed rafter ends.  It is pierced by three chimneys with corbelled caps.  It was built by Richard Heath Dabney, Professor of History and later Dean of the Graduate School of Arts and Sciences at the University of Virginia, father of Virginius Dabney (1901-1995).  Dabney sold the house in 1907.  The house is occupied by the Montessori School of Charlottesville.

It was listed on the National Register of Historic Places in 1984.

References

External links
Montessori School of Charlottesville website

Houses on the National Register of Historic Places in Virginia
Queen Anne architecture in Virginia
Houses completed in 1894
Houses in Charlottesville, Virginia
National Register of Historic Places in Charlottesville, Virginia